Jono Schnell, known professionally by his stage name Quix (stylised in all caps), is a New Zealand DJ and electronic music producer. Since 2020, he has also been a part of the electronic music duo known as Tiger Drool, alongside fellow record producer, Robert Vincent Hughes.

Quix was born and raised in Auckland and grew up in a Christian home. His considers himself Christian and currently goes to the Hillsong Church along with his wife. At a young age, his mother home-schooled him for a period of time.  He started experimenting with music when he was 9-years-old playing in bands and started getting into EDM when he was 14. He chose the moniker Quix and got his name from translating his last name from German which means fast. In 2017 he dropped his debut EP titled "Heaps Cool". One of his most popular songs is his collaboration with Boombox Cartel "Supernatural", which has received millions of plays and was released on the label Mad Decent. He also has a collab with Alison Wonderland titled "TimeE".

Discography

Extended plays

Singles

Solo

With Tiger Drool

References 

Trap musicians (EDM)
Remixers
Year of birth missing (living people)
Living people
New Zealand DJs
New Zealand record producers
Dim Mak Records artists
Electronic dance music DJs